The 2008 King Cup of Champions was the 33rd edition of the King Cup of Champions.

The cup winner were guaranteed a place in the 2009 AFC Champions League.

Participating teams

Level 1

 Al-Hilal : Saudi Premier League and Crown Prince Cup champion
 Al-Ittihad : Saudi Premier League runner up
 Al-Nasr : Saudi Federation Cup Champion
 Al-Shabab : Saudi Premier League 3rd place

Level 2

 Al-Ittifaq : Saudi Premier League 4th place
 Al-Wahda : Saudi Premier League 6th place
 Al Hazm : Saudi Premier League 7th place
 Al-Ahli : Saudi Premier League 8th place

Fixtures and results

Bracket

Champions

External links
Final at Kooora.com 
Final at Goalzz.com

2008
2007–08 in Saudi Arabian football
2007–08 domestic association football cups